Frederick Hudson "Fred" Dore (July 31, 1925 – May 16, 1996) was an American lawyer and politician in the state of Washington. He served in the Washington House of Representatives from 1953 to 1959 for district 37, and in the Senate from 1959 to 1975. He was also a Washington Supreme Court justice from 1981 to 1993.

The Fred H. and Mary S. Dore Foundation was established after his death and provides scholarships, grants, and endowments related to Sudden Infant Death Syndrome (SIDS), enhancing the educational opportunities for students of achievement, and assisting the under-served in our communities.

References

1996 deaths
1925 births
Justices of the Washington Supreme Court
Democratic Party Washington (state) state senators
Democratic Party members of the Washington House of Representatives
20th-century American judges
20th-century American politicians